Bankole Ajibabi Omotoso (born 21 April 1943), also known as Kole Omotoso, is a Nigerian writer and intellectual best known for his works of fiction and in South Africa as the "Yebo Gogo man" in adverts for the telecommunications company Vodacom.  His written work is known for its dedication and commitment to fusing a socio-political reappraisal of Africa and respect for human dignity into most of his works.

Early life and education
Kole Omotoso was born into a Yoruba family in Akure, Ondo State, Nigeria. He was raised by his mother and maternal grandparents after the death of his father. Though the lack of a father figure could crush a young Nigerian boy, the events of his early childhood contributed a great deal to his development as a man and also as a writer. Omotoso was educated at King's College, Lagos, and the University of Ibadan and then undertook a doctoral thesis on the modern Arabic writer Ahmad Ba Kathir at the University of Edinburgh.

Later life
Omotoso returned to Ibadan to lecture on Arabic studies (1972–76), then moved to the University of Ife to work in drama (1976–88). He became a writer for various magazines (including West Africa) in the 1970s and was well known among Nigeria's literate elites. His major themes include interracial marriage, comic aspects of the Biafran-Nigerian conflict, and the human condition—as exemplified in friendship between the Yoruba and the Igbo and in relationships between children and parents.

His 1988 historical novel about Nigeria, Just Before Dawn (Spectrum Books), was controversial and led Omotoso to leave his native country. After visiting professorships in English at the University of Stirling and the National University of Lesotho and a spell at the Talawa Theatre Company, London, he became a professor of English at the University of the Western Cape in South Africa (1991–2000). From 2001 to 2003 he was a professor in the Drama Department at Stellenbosch University.

He also writes a number of columns in African newspapers, most notably the "Trouble Travels" column in the Nigeria's Sunday Guardian. From 2013 to 2016, he was a patron of the Etisalat Prize for Literature.

In the mid-1990s and 2010s he appeared as the "Yebo Gogo man" in a number television advertisements for Vodacom mobile phones.

Omotoso is married with three children — including filmmaker Akin Omotoso and writer Yewande Omotoso — and currently lives in Centurion, Gauteng, South Africa.

Themes
Omotoso grew up during the rising tide of radical nationalism and was enamored by the potential that lay in the future of his country. His fiction ranges widely over the human condition, and themes include intergenerational and interracial relationships. Fela's Choice is an early example of Nigerian detective fiction. However, with the ascent of social and political decay, a few years after independence, he became deeply interested in writing about fiction. Fiction was an avenue that exists apart from the decay of real life and where deep reconstructions about life and ideas come true. It was also an avenue to experiment on social and political ideas for societal change and advancement. Omotoso's non-fiction is wide-ranging in subject matter.

Works

Fiction
The Edifice (1971)
The Combat (1972; Penguin Classics, 2008)
Miracles (short stories) (1973)
Fela's Choice (1974)
Sacrifice (1974, 1978)
The Scales (1976)
To Borrow a Wandering Leaf (1978)
Memories of Our Recent Boom (1982)
Just Before Dawn (Spectrum Books, 1988)

Drama
The Curse (1976)
Shadows in the Horizon (1977)

Non-fiction
The Form of the African Novel (1979 etc.)
The Theatrical Into Theatre: a study of the drama and theatre of the English-speaking Caribbean (1982)
Season of Migration to the South: Africa's crises reconsidered (1994)
Achebe or Soyinka? A Study in Contrasts (1995)
Woza Africa (1997)

References

Uko Atai, African Writers Vol. 2 1997

External links
Kole Omotoso

1943 births
People from Akure
University of Ibadan alumni
Alumni of the University of Edinburgh
Living people
Yoruba writers
Academic staff of the University of the Western Cape
Nigerian expatriates in South Africa
King's College, Lagos alumni
20th-century Nigerian novelists
English-language writers from Nigeria
Academic staff of Obafemi Awolowo University
International Writing Program alumni
Nigerian dramatists and playwrights
Nigerian male novelists
Kole
20th-century male writers